Isaac Gascoyne (21 August 1763 – 26 August 1841) was a British Army officer and Tory politician. He was born at Barking, London Essex on 21 August 1763, the third son of Bamber Gascoyne (senior) and Mary Green and was educated at Felsted School.

Military career
On 8 February 1779, Gascoyne was commissioned as a British Army Officer, joining the 20th Regiment of Foot with the rank of Ensign. In July of the following year, still as an Ensign, he transferred to the Coldstream Guards. Gradually rising in rank, he became a Lieutenant on 18 August 1784 and Captain on 5 December 1792, and fought at the Battle of Lincelles in 1793, where he was wounded, but continued to hold various posts into the 1810s, becoming Lieutenant Colonel of the 16th Regiment of Foot on 7 June 1799, Major-General on 29 April 1802, Colonel of the 7th West India Regiment on 10 October 1805, Lieutenant-General on 25 April 1808, and was Colonel of the 54th (West Norfolk) Regiment of Foot from 1 June 1816.

In August 1819 he was promoted to General in charge of the 54th Foot regiment.

Political career
In 1796, Gascoyne was elected as a Member of Parliament for Liverpool, succeeding his elder brother, Bamber Gascoyne. While there, he used his position to strongly oppose the abolition of the Slave Trade and the Reform Act 1832. He also opposed both the abolition of bull-baiting and Catholic Emancipation.

In 1811, Gascoyne received a number of petitions from Liverpool resident John Bellingham, calling for him to take up his claim for compensation from the British government for a period of imprisonment he had suffered in Russia. In May 1812, Bellingham entered the lobby of the House of Commons and shot Prime Minister Spencer Perceval dead. Gascoyne was able to recognise Bellingham, providing leads in the immediate aftermath.

In 1831, Gascoyne moved a motion opposing a reduction of the seats allocated to England. The Government opposed this, holding that it was necessary to address the over-representation of England.  When Gascoyne's motion was carried, the Government called the 1831 general election, in an attempt to gain a clear majority for reform.

Gascoyne lost his seat on 4 May after the 1831 election, and died on 26 August 1841 at 71 South Audley Street, London, from an inflammation in his bowels. He was buried in Kensal Green Cemetery, London.

Personal life and family
He has an extensive biographical entry in the Dictionary of National Biography.

Isaac Gascoyne was the father of General Ernest Frederick Gascoyne, of Raby Hall, Liverpool (1796–1867), who is the great-great-great-grandfather of Bamber Gascoigne.

His daughter Charlotte Gascoyne married on 13 October 1821 Rear Admiral Hon. George Pryse Campbell (1793 – 12 January 1858), son of John Campbell of Cawdor, 1st Baron Cawdor of Castlemartin, and Lady Isabella Caroline Howard.

Notes and references

External links
 

1763 births
1841 deaths
British Army lieutenant generals
British Army personnel of the French Revolutionary Wars
Members of the Parliament of Great Britain for Liverpool
British MPs 1796–1800
Members of the Parliament of the United Kingdom for Liverpool
UK MPs 1801–1802
UK MPs 1802–1806
UK MPs 1806–1807
UK MPs 1807–1812
UK MPs 1812–1818
UK MPs 1818–1820
UK MPs 1820–1826
UK MPs 1826–1830
UK MPs 1830–1831
Ultra-Tory MPs
Burials at Kensal Green Cemetery
Lancashire Fusiliers officers
Coldstream Guards officers